William (Bill) Kaye AO QC (8 February 1919 – 12 May 2012) was an Australian lawyer and judge who served on the Supreme Court of Victoria from 1972 to 1990.

Kaye was born in Melbourne to Chana (née Reizel) and Zelman Kaye. His parents were Ukrainian-Jewish immigrants originally from Berdiansk, and his father's original name was Shlomo Komesaroff. Kaye attended Scotch College before going on to study law the University of Melbourne. He enlisted in the Royal Australian Navy in 1941, and during the war served on HMAS Warrego and Cowra. He married Henrietta Ellinson while on leave in 1943; they had four children together, including Justice Stephen Kaye.

Kaye was admitted to the bar in 1946, and came to specialise in personal injury cases and in criminal and commercial law. He was appointed Queen's Counsel in 1962, and in 1971 served on the royal commission into the collapse of the West Gate Bridge. In 1972, Kaye replaced Ninian Stephen on the Supreme Court of Victoria. He served until his retirement in 1991, and in 1990 was made an Officer of the Order of Australia (AO). Kaye was the first Jew to serve on the Victorian Supreme Court, and was a member of the International Association of Jewish Lawyers and Jurists. He and his wife regularly visited Israel, and he was friends with members of the Israeli Supreme Court.

References
 Obituary: Learned 'white pointer' determinedly pursued justice, June 2012
 Obituary: The Hon. William Kaye AO QC, August 2012
 It's An Honour

See also
 List of Judges of the Supreme Court of Victoria

1919 births
2012 deaths
Australian barristers
Australian people of Ukrainian-Jewish descent
Officers of the Order of Australia
Judges of the Supreme Court of Victoria
People educated at Scotch College, Melbourne
People from Melbourne
University of Melbourne alumni
Australian King's Counsel